Abyakto is a 2020 Indian Bengali-language drama film directed by Arjunn Dutta, starring  Arpita Chatterjee, Adil Hussain, Anubhav Kanjilal, Anirban Ghosh,  Lily Chakravarty and Kheya Chattopadhyay. While the film was showcased in various festivals from 2018, the theatrical release was on 31 January 2020. Abyakto received critical acclaim.

Plot
Abyakto is a poignant tale of a mother and son. The story encapsulates the unusual journey of Indra from his childhood and adolescence to adulthood. A series of unexplained events turn him into a man he never ought to be.

Cast
 Arpita Chatterjee as Saathi, the mother
 Adil Hussain as Rudra, a friend of Saathi
 Anubhav Kanjilal as Indra, the son
 Anirban Ghosh as Koushik, the father
 Lily Chakravarty
 Kheya Chattopadhyay

Release
Abyakto was screened at The Kolkata International Film Festival in 2018. It was selected in the Indian Panorama section of 49th International Film Festival of India (IFFI). It was also selected to compete in the category of Centenary Award for the best debut feature film of a director at the same festival.

Reception
Abyakto received positive reviews in festival circuits. Reviewers praised the simplicity of the story telling, cinematography, background score, and acting. Bahskar Chattopadyay, reviewing for the Firstpost, particularly noted the restrained simple script and the "terrific performance" of Arpita Chatterjee. Suparna Thombare of Cinestaan praised director Dutta's "sensitive and creative story-telling ".

Upon its commercial release, the film received widespread appreciation from reviewers in print and electronic media.

References

External links
 

2018 drama films
Bengali-language Indian films
2018 films
2010s Bengali-language films
Indian drama films
Films directed by Arjunn Dutta